Lohne, also known commonly as Lone is a village in Kristiansand municipality in Agder county, Norway.

References

Villages in Agder
Geography of Kristiansand